Awang Kamaruddin bin Awang Bohan (born 10 January 1995) is Malaysian footballer for Sarawak in the Malaysia Premier League as a central midfielder.

Career statistics

Club

References

External links
 

1995 births
Living people
Malaysian footballers
Sarawak FA players
Malaysia Super League players
People from Sarawak
Association football midfielders